Mariska Magdolna Hargitay (born January 23, 1964) is an American actress, director, producer and philanthropist. The daughter of bodybuilder and actor Mickey Hargitay and actress Jayne Mansfield, her accolades include a Golden Globe Award, a Primetime Emmy Award and two People's Choice Awards.

Hargitay made her debut with an appearance in the music video "She Loves My Car" (1984) by Ronnie Milsap, and subsequently starred in the horror comedy film Ghoulies (1985). She had a main role in the crime drama series Downtown (1986), played the recurring role of Carly Fixx in Falcon Crest (1988), and continued to appear in numerous film and television series throughout the 1980s and 1990s. Her breakthrough came with playing Olivia Benson on the NBC drama series Law & Order: Special Victims Unit (1999–present), for which she has received acclaim and several accolades; she reprises the role in Law & Order: Organized Crime (2021–present). 

Outside of acting, she founded the Joyful Heart Foundation, which provides support to people who have been sexually abused.

Early life

Hargitay was born at Providence Saint John's Health Center in Santa Monica, California, the daughter of actress and 1950s-era sex symbol Jayne Mansfield. Her father was the Hungarian-born former Mr. Universe, Mickey Hargitay. Her first and middle names are Hungarian and refer to Mary Magdalene (Mariska is a diminutive of Mary). She was raised Catholic and has two older brothers, Miklós and Zoltán, as well as three half-siblings, Jayne Marie Mansfield and Antonio "Tony" Cimber (from her mother's first and third marriages, respectively) and Tina Hargitay (from her father's first marriage). Hargitay's parents divorced in May 1963, but a judge later found their Mexican divorce invalid. They reconciled a few months before Hargitay's birth in January 1964, but soon separated again. In August 1964, Hargitay's mother successfully petitioned the court to rule the Mexican divorce legal. A few weeks later, Mansfield married the director Matt Cimber, who had directed her in a 1964 production of the William Inge play Bus Stop. By the summer of 1966, however, Mansfield and Cimber had filed for divorce.

On June 29, 1967, Mansfield was in an automobile accident on a stretch of U.S. Route 90 between New Orleans and Bay St. Louis, Mississippi. The accident ripped off the top of the car, instantly killing Mansfield, her boyfriend Sam Brody, and the driver. Asleep in the back of the vehicle, Mariska, then three-and-a-half years old, was left with a zigzag scar on one side of her head. Her brothers, Miklós and Zoltán, escaped with minor injuries. After the death of their mother, the three siblings were raised by their father and his third wife, Ellen Siano. Hargitay dislikes comparisons with her famous mother and, at age 18, said, "My dad was Mr. Universe, so it would be fun for me to be Miss Universe". Hargitay has said that the early loss of her mother left "a hole in my life that won't ever be filled. I will never get over it. I will always be a girl who lost her mom". Hargitay's father died in 2006 from multiple myeloma in Los Angeles, California, at age 80.

While a student at her Catholic secondary school, Marymount High School, Hargitay was active in cheerleading, student government, athletics, and the theater program. She enjoyed acting and enrolled at UCLA after graduation from high school in 1982. That same year, Hargitay was crowned Miss Beverly Hills USA. By the time she was a freshman in college, Hargitay had an agent and several small roles to her credit. She attended UCLA School of Theater Film and Television where she was a member of Kappa Kappa Gamma. She left before completing her degree. Hargitay attended Groundlings Theatre and School in Los Angeles.

Career
After Hargitay was crowned Miss Beverly Hills USA, she competed in the Miss California USA pageant the following year and placed fourth runner-up to Julie Hayek, who was later crowned Miss USA. In 1984, Hargitay appeared in Ronnie Milsap's music video for "She Loves My Car", the first country music video to appear on MTV. A year later she had a small role in the horror film Ghoulies. Hargitay has appeared on numerous other television programs, including: Freddy's Nightmares – A Nightmare on Elm Street: The Series, Ellen, All-American Girl, Baywatch, Cracker, Gabriel's Fire, In the Heat of the Night, The Single Guy, Wiseguy, and thirtysomething. Her voice is featured on the 2005 video game True Crime: New York City. Hargitay also had a minor role in the 1995 film Leaving Las Vegas. She briefly replaced Gabrielle Fitzpatrick as Dulcea in Mighty Morphin Power Rangers: The Movie, although her scenes were cut from the film when Fitzpatrick recovered from her surgery and returned to the film. In 1988, she had a recurring role as Carly Fixx in the soap opera Falcon Crest. She portrayed police officer Angela Garcia in the 1992 series Tequila and Bonetti and appeared in the two-part fourth season finale episode of Seinfeld, where they had her read for the role of Elaine Benes in "The Pilot". She was considered for the character of Elaine Benes on Seinfeld itself before it began. Two years later, Hargitay portrayed Didi Edelstein, the sexy next-door neighbor, in the 1995 sitcom Can't Hurry Love, which starred Nancy McKeon. In 1997, Hargitay played detective Nina Echeverria on the drama series Prince Street, and had a recurring role as inept desk clerk Cynthia Hooper during the fourth season of ER.Hargitay said in 1986 that she never thought about doing television until a role on the one-hour adventure drama series Downtown was offered. In fact, she experienced difficulties in her efforts to begin a career as a Hollywood actor. Hargitay endured frequent comparisons to her mother. Casting for the lead characters of NBC police procedural television drama series Law & Order: Special Victims Unit occurred in the spring of 1999. Dick Wolf, along with officials from NBC and Studios USA, were at the final auditions for the two leads at Rockefeller Center. The last round had been narrowed down to six finalists. For the female lead – Detective Olivia Benson – Samantha Mathis, Reiko Aylesworth, and Hargitay were being considered. For the male lead – Detective Elliot Stabler – the finalists were Tim Matheson, John Slattery, and Christopher Meloni. Meloni and Hargitay had auditioned in the final round together, and after the actors left, there was a moment of dead silence, after which Wolf blurted out, "Oh well. There's no doubt who we should choose – Hargitay and Meloni." The duo, who Wolf believed had the perfect chemistry from the first time he saw them together, were his first choice. Garth Ancier, then head of NBC Entertainment, agreed, and the rest of the panel assembled voiced their assent. Hargitay trained as a rape crisis advocate to prepare for the role of Benson. She has portrayed Benson since 1999. Hargitay won an Emmy and a Golden Globe for the role. She received UCLA's TFT Distinguished Alumni Award in 2011 and was honored at the school's June commencement ceremony. During the last months of her pregnancy in 2006, Hargitay took maternity leave from SVU, and was temporarily replaced by Connie Nielsen, who portrayed Stabler's temporary partner Dani Beck.

In late December 2008, Hargitay suffered a partially collapsed lung after taking a fall during a stunt on the set of SVU. She underwent surgery in January and returned to work shortly afterward. On March 3, 2009, she was hospitalized after suffering from chest pains related to the injury. She missed one episode on SVU tenth season. In May 2009, after the show's tenth season, Hargitay and Meloni's contracts expired when they were reportedly making $375,000–$385,000 per episode. During negotiations in April for a new contract, the duo attempted to receive a percentage of the show's profits as other high-profile Law and Order actors had done in the past. It was rumored that NBC threatened to replace Hargitay and Meloni if they persisted in their demands. However, two months later it was officially reported that both their contracts had been renewed for two more years. When the thirteenth season was about to air, initial reports indicated that Hargitay would appear in only the first 13 episodes. However, NBC chairman Bob Greenblatt later clarified that she would be in every episode of the season. As of August 2012, Hargitay was earning approximately $400,000–$500,000 per episode of Law & Order: Special Victims Unit. In 2013, Hargitay was awarded with the 2,511th star of the Hollywood Walk of Fame. Her star was placed next to the star of her mother, which is located at 6328 Hollywood Boulevard. At the 2015 MTV Video Music Awards, Hargitay won the "Video of the Year" Award, shared with Taylor Swift and all of the celebrities that appeared in the music video for Swift's song "Bad Blood". Hargitay was a guest narrator at Disney's Candlelight Processional December 19–20, 2022.

Philanthropy 
Hargitay is the founder and former president of the Joyful Heart Foundation, an organization established in 2004 to provide support to survivors of sexual assault, domestic violence, and child abuse. According to Hargitay, she was inspired by an encounter with a pod of dolphins that surrounded her while she was swimming off the coast of Hawaii at the age of 15. The encounter, which had ignited profound spiritual feelings within her, was one that Hargitay hoped to share with others. As of November 2010, the Joyful Heart Foundation has sent over 5,000 women and children on therapeutic programs in New York, Los Angeles, and Hawaii, which combine yoga, meditation, massage, journaling, and swimming with dolphins. Hargitay said, "I started getting fan mail from survivors who felt a connection to Olivia. In many of these letters, people would disclose their personal stories of abuse—some for the very first time. I remember getting the sense that many were living in isolation with so much shame, but the shame belonged to the perpetrators. I wanted to help find a way to help people reclaim their lives and live them with a renewed sense of possibility and hope. And that's what we work to do every day at Joyful Heart."Since Hargitay received these letters from women, she knew that she had to use her platform to do something meaningful. Hargitay's character, Olivia Benson, was heavily involved in rape and domestic violence cases in New York; in many episodes she defended the women, because she knew the trauma that they had experienced. Some women who watched the show felt a connection with her, which led them to send Hargitay letters because they thought she could do something with them. She, in fact, did; Hargitay became a certified rape counselor. With this, she was able to talk to these women, make them feel better, and let them know that they are not alone; she helped the victims to be able to live their lives again. According to Hargitay, the Foundation has raised $20 million and helped approximately 5,000 survivors as of April 2011. Reference to the Joyful Heart Foundation was worked into episodes of Special Victims Unit, via a necklace containing two pendants representing the Foundation that Hargitay's character began wearing in the show's 13th season. The Foundation works with several brands to create products supporting the cause, including Me&Ro, Michael Stars, and AZIAM's Wife Lover Tanks.

Back in November 2009, Hargitay and the Joyful Heart Foundation built healing and wellness kits for women who suffered domestic violence attacks and were currently in the Los Angeles County's domestic violence shelters. They created enough kits to give one to each of about 600 women. In California, the domestic violence services budget was in a major crisis, and shelters were forced to turn women away. Hargitay and her foundation donated money to the cause. Hargitay has worked with Michigan Police and Wayne County Prosecutor Kym Worthy to raise awareness about the statistics of untested rape kits. She produced a documentary, I Am Evidence, following the thousands of untested rape kits; Hargitay called this lack of testing "the clearest and most shocking demonstration of how we regard these crimes in our country." Hargitay appeared in the 17th season of NBC's The More You Know public service announcements in 2006, and again in the spring of 2009. She is an honorary board member director of the Multiple Myeloma Research Foundation. On September 27, 2011, Hargitay donated $100,000 to her alma mater, the UCLA School of Theater Film and Television for scholarship. In 2012, Hargitay campaigned for the reauthorization of the Violence Against Women Act (VAWA).

Personal life
On August 28, 2004, in Santa Barbara, California, Hargitay married Peter Hermann, an actor whom she met on the set of Law & Order: SVU, on which he plays the recurring role of defense attorney Trevor Langan. On June 28, 2006, Hargitay gave birth to their son, August, by an emergency caesarean section. In April 2011, she and her husband adopted a baby girl, Amaya, and attended her birth. In October 2011, she and her husband adopted a son, Andrew, who had been born in 2011. In January 2007 she and her older son appeared in a Got Milk? advertisement.

Hargitay speaks five languages: English, French, Hungarian, Spanish, and Italian. She is the godmother to Sophia, one of co-star Christopher Meloni's children. In a 2010 interview with Good Housekeeping, Hargitay stated that she considers herself a Christian.

Filmography

Television

Film

Video games

Music videos

Director

Producer

Awards and nominations

References

General and cited references

External links

 Joyful Heart Foundation, founded by Hargitay
 

1964 births
Living people
20th-century American actresses
21st-century American actresses
Activists from California
Actresses from Santa Monica, California
American people of Cornish descent
American people of English descent
American people of German descent
American people of Hungarian descent
American film actresses
American humanitarians
American television actresses
American television directors
Best Drama Actress Golden Globe (television) winners
Outstanding Performance by a Lead Actress in a Drama Series Primetime Emmy Award winners
UCLA Film School alumni
Sexual abuse victim advocates
Jayne Mansfield
American women television directors
Women humanitarians